"New World Order" is the first episode of the American television miniseries The Falcon and the Winter Soldier, based on Marvel Comics featuring the characters Sam Wilson / Falcon and Bucky Barnes / Winter Soldier. It follows the pair as they adjust to life after returning from the Blip at the end of Avengers: Endgame (2019). The episode is set in the Marvel Cinematic Universe (MCU), sharing continuity with the films of the franchise. It was written by head writer Malcolm Spellman and directed by Kari Skogland.

Sebastian Stan and Anthony Mackie reprise their respective roles as Bucky Barnes and Sam Wilson from the film series, with Wyatt Russell, Erin Kellyman, Danny Ramirez, Georges St-Pierre, Adepero Oduye, and Don Cheadle also starring. Development began by October 2018, with Spellman hired to serve as head writer of the series. Skogland joined in May 2019. They focused on exploring the title characters, including themes related to Wilson's life as a Black superhero in America and his response to being handed the mantle of Captain America in Endgame. Filming took place at Pinewood Atlanta Studios in Atlanta, Georgia, with location filming occurring in the Atlanta metropolitan area and in Prague.

"New World Order" was released on the streaming service Disney+ on March 19, 2021. It became the most-watched Disney+ series premiere, surpassing the series premiere of WandaVision. The episode received positive reviews from critics, with praise going to its opening action sequence, the characterization of Wilson and Barnes, and the racial themes included. However, it received criticism over Wilson and Barnes not sharing any scenes together and there were some negative comparisons made between the episode and Marvel Television's Netflix series. It received several accolades, including a Primetime Emmy Award nomination for Cheadle's role as James Rhodes.

Plot 
Six months after half of all life returned from the Blip, the U.S. Air Force sends Sam Wilson to stop a plane hijacking over Tunisia by the terrorist group LAF, led by Georges Batroc. With ground support from first lieutenant Joaquin Torres, Wilson fights the terrorists and rescues Air Force Captain Vassant before they cross into Libyan airspace and cause an international incident. On the ground, Torres tells Wilson about another terrorist group, the Flag Smashers, who believe life was better during the Blip.

In Washington, D.C., Wilson gives Captain America's shield to the U.S. government to display in a museum exhibit about Steve Rogers. He later explains to James Rhodes that he feels like the shield still belongs to Rogers. In Delacroix, Louisiana, Wilson's sister Sarah struggles to keep the family fishing business going. He offers to use his status as a famous superhero to help them get a new loan, but they are turned down due to the business's poor profits and Wilson's lack of income during his five year absence.

Meanwhile, in New York City, Bucky Barnes attends government-mandated therapy after being pardoned for his actions as the brainwashed assassin known as the Winter Soldier. He discusses his attempts to make amends for his time as the Winter Soldier with his therapist, Dr. Raynor. Barnes later has lunch with an elderly man named Yori, who convinces him to go on a date with a waitress named Leah. Both Yori and Leah discuss how Yori's son RJ was killed with no explanation. Barnes recalls killing RJ as the Winter Soldier, which happened after RJ witnessed an assassination by him in the hotel where he was staying. Barnes is unable to reveal this to Yori, and has also been ignoring text messages from Wilson.

Torres investigates the Flag Smashers and sees a bank robbery in Switzerland perpetrated by a group member with superhuman strength. Torres confronts him, but is knocked unconscious. He later informs Wilson of what he has learned. Wilson then sees the government announce a new Captain America, giving Rogers' shield to John Walker.

Production

Development 
By October 2018, Marvel Studios was developing a limited series starring Anthony Mackie's Sam Wilson / Falcon and Sebastian Stan's Bucky Barnes / Winter Soldier from the Marvel Cinematic Universe (MCU) films. Malcolm Spellman was hired as head writer of the series, which was announced as The Falcon and the Winter Soldier in April 2019. Spellman modeled the series after buddy films that deal with race, such as 48 Hrs. (1982), The Defiant Ones (1958), Lethal Weapon (1987), and Rush Hour (1998). Kari Skogland was hired to direct the miniseries a month later, and executive produced alongside Spellman and Marvel Studios' Kevin Feige, Louis D'Esposito, Victoria Alonso, and Nate Moore. Written by Spellman, the first episode is titled "New World Order", and was released on the streaming service Disney+ on March 19, 2021.

Writing
The series is set six months after the film Avengers: Endgame (2019), and the episode's title refers to the state of the MCU following the Blip as seen in that film. Wilson and Barnes do not appear together in the episode, which explores where each of the characters are separately after Endgame. This was Feige's idea, as he said the two characters had always existed within a larger context in the MCU films, and he felt they needed to be introduced to the series' audience as individuals before they could be brought together as a team. Spellman explained that in showing the two characters lives after the events of Endgame, they wanted to explore commonalities between the post-Blip MCU and the real world, focusing on smaller details such as Wilson trying to get a loan. Spellman revealed that the specifics of that scene were debated "all the way up to the top" at Marvel Studios, to ensure it would resonate with audiences due to the struggle for a Black family to get a bank loan that it depicts. He added, "every one of us who is Black in day to day life have those experiences ... how could you ever write [Wilson] going to get a loan without dealing with the reality of what happens when Black people try to get loans?"

For Barnes, the episode shows him attempting to make amends for his murderous history as the Winter Soldier. This includes befriending Yori, the father of one of his victims, who Spellman intended to personify all of the Winter Soldier's victims. Barnes is also shown learning to live in the modern world, such as discussing online dating.

The central conflict that Spellman and Marvel wanted to explore with the series was whether Wilson would become Captain America after being handed the shield by Steve Rogers at the end of Endgame. They felt that having the government "betray" Wilson by naming someone else as Captain America would be the most appropriate way to approach this question while aligning with the series' themes, and went through "50,000 different versions" before settling on the final storyline: Wilson chooses to give up the shield early in the episode, and then John Walker is introduced as a new government-approved Captain America at the end. Skogland described this ending as "the hammer into the nail" for the conversation started when Wilson decides to give up the shield, and said it is what kickstarts the rest of the series' story. She highlighted the nationalistic language used in the government announcement, such as "relatable", "this country", and "America's greatest values". Spellman explained that Wilson seeing the government handing the shield to "some unknown white guy" played into his doubts about himself, and added that a Black man being betrayed by his country was "powerful" but unsurprising to Wilson and the audience. Spellman initially wanted the government to take the shield from Wilson, but Moore suggested that Wilson relinquish it on his own to make it more of a character moment.

When Wilson decides to give up the shield, his decision is questioned by James "Rhodey" Rhodes. Skogland noted that Rhodes serves as a mentor to Wilson in the series, while Spellman said the two have "a shorthand" that allows the audience to "fill in the blanks" when the pair pause in the scene. Spellman also felt that it was apparent to audiences that the scene features the two main Black superheroes from the MCU having a quiet moment together, and said there is an underlying suggestion that Rhodes as the hero War Machine has filled the role left by Tony Stark / Iron Man and he is wondering why Wilson has not done the same for Rogers' mantle. Many iterations of this scene were discussed, including a version where Wilson and Rhodes talk while flying in their respective superhero suits, but ultimately a quieter and more poignant direction was taken.

Casting 
The episode stars Sebastian Stan as Bucky Barnes, Anthony Mackie as Sam Wilson, Wyatt Russell as John Walker, Erin Kellyman as Karli Morgenthau, Danny Ramirez as Joaquin Torres, Georges St-Pierre as Georges Batroc, Adepero Oduye as Sarah Wilson, and Don Cheadle as James "Rhodey" Rhodes. Also appearing are Desmond Chiam, Dani Deetté, and Indya Bussey as the Flag Smashers Dovich, Gigi, and DeeDee, respectively, Amy Aquino as Barnes' therapist Dr. Raynor, Chase River McGhee and Aaron Haynes as Wilson's nephews Cass and AJ, Ken Takemoto as Yori, Ian Gregg as Unique, Miki Ishikawa as Leah, Vince Pisani as a loan officer, Alphie Hyorth as a government official, Rebecca Lines as Senator Atwood, Jon Briddell as Major Hill, Miles Brew as Colonel Vassant, Charles Black as Carlos, and Akie Kotabe as Yori's son RJ. Archival audio of Chris Evans as Steve Rogers from Avengers: Endgame is heard in the episode.

Filming and visual effects 
Filming took place at Pinewood Atlanta Studios in Atlanta, Georgia, with Skogland directing, and P.J. Dillon serving as cinematographer. Location filming took place in the Atlanta metropolitan area and in Prague. Feige encouraged Skogland to use her own directing style rather than trying to match with the MCU films, and she chose to use different camera work that was "more off-kilter than Marvel usually is" to create a more intimate feeling. This included opening the episode with Wilson quietly ironing, and using "shallow focus and interesting camera angles" for Barnes' therapy scenes. She felt the latter would allow the audience to get inside Barnes' head. For Wilson's opening action sequence, Skogland wanted the audience to feel like they were with the character, and researched how people use Go Pro cameras when jumping out of airplanes. Skogland wanted the final scene, introducing Walker as the new Captain America, to be "hero-ise[d]", using low angles and "sneaky imagery" to make it more difficult to see Walker's face. Visual effects for the episode were created by Weta Digital, QPPE, Cantina Creative, Trixter, Crafty Apes, Stereo D, Digital Frontier FX, and Tippett Studio.

Music 
Selections from composer Henry Jackman's score for the episode were included in the series' Vol. 1 soundtrack album, which was released digitally by Marvel Music and Hollywood Records on April 9, 2021.

Marketing 
On March 19, 2021, Marvel announced a series of posters that were created by various artists to correspond with the episodes of the series. The posters were released weekly ahead of each episode, with the first poster, designed by SzarkaArt, being revealed on March 19. After the episode's release, Marvel announced merchandise inspired by the episode as part of its weekly "Marvel Must Haves" promotion for each episode of the series, including apparel, accessories, toys, a replica Captain America shield, and collectible Topps trading cards for the digital card game Marvel Collect!

Reception

Audience viewership 
Disney+ announced that "New World Order" was the most-watched series premiere for the service in its opening weekend (March 19 to 22, 2021), besting the premieres of WandaVision and the second season of The Mandalorian. Using its proprietary Automatic Content Recognition technology on opted-in smart TVs, Samba TV reported that 1.7 million households watched the episode in its opening weekend. Nielsen Media Research, who measure the number of minutes watched by United States audiences on television sets, listed The Falcon and the Winter Soldier as the second-most-watched original series across streaming services for the week of March 15–21, with 495 million minutes viewed. This is around 9.9 million views based on the episode's running time, and is ahead of the 434 million minutes of WandaVision that were viewed in its premiere week.

Critical response 
The review aggregator website Rotten Tomatoes reported a 92% approval rating with an average score of 7.6/10 based on 133 reviews. The site's critical consensus reads, "An ambitious blend of big screen action and intimate storytelling, The Falcon and the Winter Soldiers opening episode makes a strong case that smaller MCU moments can still pack a serious punch."

Giving the episode a "B+", Matt Webb Mitovich from TVLine said the episode promised feature film-quality action as well as overdue insight into the characters of Wilson and Barnes. He called the opening set piece "a  piece of filmmaking" that upgraded Wilson from a sidekick to a lead hero, and also enjoyed the intimacy of Wilson's scenes with his sister. Matt Purslow at IGN gave the episode an 8 out of 10, saying it was somber, measured, and possessed "genuine depth". Purslow praised the action and felt the episode thoughtfully tackled themes such as trauma, duty, and legacy, especially highlighting the scene where Sam and Sarah attempt to get a loan from the bank which he called "brilliantly multi-faceted". Writing for Variety, Daniel D'Addario said the episode's action was "lighter and more fluid than the dirgey relentlessness of Avengers megabattles" but also felt it had a "curiosity about what it is to be a superhero" that D'Addario felt was missing from the MCU films. Daniel Fienberg from The Hollywood Reporter felt he needed to review the episode as two shows: Wilson's show features "the boffo action opening, and also a richer exploration of the lives of those left behind in the Snap and of the internal contradictions of being a Black superhero in a country that doesn't fully embrace Blackness", adding there was an overall "freshness" with Wilson's story; Barnes' story, however, "feels basically like the Marvel shows Jeph Loeb produced for Netflix" which was "familiar and glum". Fienberg was looking forward to when the two characters would begin to interact.

Entertainment Weeklys Chancellor Agard felt the opening set piece was Marvel wanting to prove that the series would match the production value of the films. He felt the strongest aspect of the episode was its examination of Wilson and Barnes, with Mackie and Stan having "more complex material to play than they ever got in the movies". Agard also enjoyed the bank loan scene, since it presented an interesting obstacle for Wilson and acknowledged the "harsh realities about being Black in America", and was excited to see how Walker's introduction as the new Captain America would intersect with the Flag Smashers. However, Agard criticized the episode's pacing which he felt prioritized the season's story over the episode's, comparing this to the Marvel Netflix series. He was also critical of Mackie and Stan not having any scenes together. He gave "New World Order" a "B". Agard's colleague Christian Holub described the episode as "fairly straightforward" and felt the series would most likely not lend itself to all the theorizing that the previous Marvel Studios' series, WandaVision, had. Like Agard, Holub enjoyed the action particularly in the opening, but was "less engaged" with the episode's character-focused scenes.

Sulagna Misra gave the episode a "B" for The A.V. Club, calling it a "redux" of Captain America: The Winter Soldier (2014) without Captain America. Misra said the opening sequence was "surprisingly inventive", likening it to Top Gun (1986), but was unclear how the ideals of the Flag Smashers aligned with each other and felt the ending of the episode was more abrupt than a cliffhanger. She also felt the episode had too much exposition and setup, but said its character moments "feel true and fleshed out" and she was hopeful that the next episode would include scenes between Wilson and Barnes. Alan Sepinwall at Rolling Stone said the episode "mostly echoes what we've seen before", comparing it to a big-budget version of the Marvel Netflix series. He felt the opening sequences had some "cool individual beats", but ultimately found it to be repetitive and lacking uniqueness for Wilson's character. He described the rest of the episode as "a lot of languid shots of one hero or the other feeling bummed about the current state of their lives, and about the state of the world", and was critical of Wilson and Barnes not having scenes together. Giving the series 3 out of 5 stars, Alec Bojalad of Den of Geek said the episode came across as a longer Marvel Studios: Legends recap episode and was frustrated that Barnes' story covered "a lot of the same ground that the character has trod thus far" unlike Wilson's.

Accolades 

In response to criticism that he should not have been nominated for an Emmy award due to his short screentime in the episode, Cheadle said that he did not "really get it either".

Notes

References

External links 
 
 Episode recap at Marvel.com

2021 American television episodes
American television series premieres
The Falcon and the Winter Soldier episodes
Marvel Cinematic Universe crossover episodes
Television episodes set in Louisiana
Television episodes set in New York City
Television episodes set in Switzerland
Television episodes set in Tunisia
Television episodes set in Washington, D.C.
Television episodes written by Malcolm Spellman
Television episodes set in the 2020s